UCOC may refer to:

 United Counties Omnibus, an English bus company that operated in Northamptonshire, Bedfordshire, and surrounding counties in England from 1921 to 1987
 United Church of Christ, a Protestant Christian denomination established 1957 in United States of America